Number the  Stars is a work of historical fiction by the American author Lois Lowry about the escape of a family of Jews from Copenhagen, Denmark, during World War II.

The story revolves around ten-year-old Annemarie Johansen, who lives with her mother, father, and sister Kirsti in Copenhagen in 1943. Annemarie becomes a part of the events related to the rescue of the Danish Jews, when thousands of Jews were to reach neutral ground in Sweden to avoid being relocated to concentration camps. She risks her life to help her best friend, Ellen Rosen, by pretending that Ellen is Annemarie's late older sister, Lise, who was killed earlier in the war by the Nazi army because of her work with the Danish Resistance. However, her former fiancé, Peter, who is partially based on the Danish resistance member Kim Malthe-Bruun, continues to help them.

The story's title is taken from a reference to Psalm 147:4 in which the writer relates that God has numbered all the stars and named each of them. It coincides into the Star of David, which is worn by Ellen Rosen on her necklace and is a symbol of Judaism.

The novel was awarded the Newbery Medal in 1990 as the previous year's "most distinguished contribution to American literature for children."

Lowry traveled to Copenhagen to conduct research and interviews for the book. She took the photo of the girl used for the cover (shown in infobox), which was used on many editions of the book. The Swedish girl used for the cover of the book went by the name of Anna Caterina Johnson, and had been photographed when she was ten by Lois Lowry.

Plot
Annemarie Johansen and Ellen Rosen, two ten-year-old best friends living in Nazi-controlled Copenhagen, Denmark, during World War II, are stopped on the street on their way home from school by German soldiers. Annemarie tells her parents about the incident when she returns home. She is told to be more careful, especially because Ellen is Jewish. The Germans soon announce that they will be "relocating" Denmark's Jewish population. At the local synagogue, the Nazis take the names and addresses of every Jewish family in Copenhagen. Ellen's parents flee Denmark with Annemarie's brother in-law, Peter. Ellen is forced to stay with the Johansens and pretend to be Lise, despite being half the age of the real Lise. One early morning, three soldiers enter the Johansens' apartment, believing the Rosens might be hiding there. Ellen tells them that she and Anne are sisters, with Anne's parents providing photos to prove this. The soldiers are suspicious of their story, but leave anyways.

Annemarie, Ellen, and Kirsti leave with Annemarie's mother the next morning for Uncle Henrik's house, which is across the lake from Sweden, a neutral country where Jews aren't persecuted. When they arrive, Henrik tells Annemarie that her Great-Aunt Birte has died, and a huge casket is placed in the middle of the living room. Annemarie doesn't believe she has a Great-Aunt Birte, but Henrik encourages her to be brave and keep this secret to herself, even from Ellen. The next evening, many people come to mourn "Aunt Birte", to Annemarie's puzzlement. Nazis come to the house and see start questioning the family. They explain that Great-Aunt Birte has died, and they are carrying out traditional rituals. When the Nazis order the casket to be opened, Mrs. Johansen lies that Great-Aunt Birte had typhus, a contagious disease, and the Nazis leave without further questions.

After they leave, the wake continues. Peter, who is present, reads to the group the beginning of Psalm 147 from the Bible, which describes the Lord God numbering the stars. Annemarie's mind begin to wander since she is unfamiliar with the psalm. After finishing, Peter opens the casket and gives the warm clothing and blankets stored inside it to the Jewish families. They leave in smaller groups to avoid drawing attention to themselves. Ellen says goodbye to Annemarie and her mother.

In the morning, Annemarie sees her mother crawling in the distance because she had broken her ankle. After helping her mother back to the house, Annemarie finds a packet of great importance to the Resistance. Mr. Rosen dropped the packet when he accidentally tripped on a flight of stairs. Mrs. Johansen tells Annemarie to fill a basket with food and the packet and to run as fast as she can. Annemarie runs off onto a wooded path in the direction of her uncle's boat. She is halted by Nazi soldiers with dogs. When they question Annemarie about what she is doing out so early, she lies that she is taking a basket with a meal to her uncle. The soldiers do not believe her, and one of them grabs at the basket. However, the soldiers eventually let her go, and Annemarie makes it to her uncle's boat. She gives Henrik an envelope that contains a handkerchief, and returns back home.

Henrik returns to Denmark later that evening from Sweden. He tells Annemarie that many Jewish people, including the Rosens, were hiding in his boat to be smuggled to Sweden. He also explains that the handkerchief in her package contained the scent of rabbit blood, which attracted the dogs, and the strong odor of cocaine, which numbed their noses, preventing them from tracking down the Jews. Several revelations are made, including that Peter is in the Danish Resistance. It also reveals that Annemarie's older sister Lise had not died from a car accident but from being run over by a tank because she was part of the Resistance.

Denmark is liberated two years after the wars end. Since then, Peter has been executed by the Nazis and is buried in an unmarked grave. Annemarie find Ellen's Star of David necklace and decides to wear it until Ellen comes back to Denmark.

Reception
Critical and popular reactions were positive. Kirkus Reviews said that "...like Annemarie, the reader is protected from the full implications of events--but will be caught up in the suspense and menace of several encounters with soldiers and in Annemarie's courageous run as a courier on the night of the escape."

In addition to winning numerous awards, the book has been one of the best-selling children's books of all time. According to Publishers Weekly, it was the 82nd best selling children's book of all time in the United States with sales above 2 million as of 2001. Sales have remained solid, even years after publication.

Film adaptation

In September 2010, actor Sean Astin announced that he had spent the last ten years attempting to get a film adaptation greenlit.

Awards 

 1990: Newbery Medal
 1990: National Jewish BookAward in the Children's Literature category

See also

The Only Way, a 1970 English language film about the rescue of the Danish Jews

References

External links

 Lois Lowry – Author

American children's novels
Denmark in World War II
Novels about the Holocaust
Jewish Danish history
Newbery Medal–winning works
Fiction set in 1943
1989 American novels
Novels by Lois Lowry
Novels set in Copenhagen
Rescue of Jews during the Holocaust
1989 children's books
American novels adapted into plays